The Caribbean Financial Action Task Force (CFATF) is an organization of states and territories of the Caribbean Basin that have agreed to implement common counter-measures against money laundering. CFATF has associate status within the Financial Action Task Force on Money Laundering (FATF).

History
The CFATF was established as the result of two key meetings convened in Aruba in and Jamaica. In Aruba in 1990 representatives of Caribbean and Central American countries developed a general approach to the problem of the laundering of criminal proceeds and made 19 recommendations. A meeting of ministers held in Kingston, Jamaica, in 1992, resulted in the Kingston Declaration, endorsing the commitment of the member states to implementing the recommendations and coordinating the implementation through establishment of the CFATF Secretariat.

Members of CFATF are:

See also 

 AMLCFT
 Asia/Pacific Group on Money Laundering
 Correspondent account
 Digital renminbi
 FATF blacklist
 ISO 37001
 Remittance
 United Nations Office on Drugs and Crime

References

Further reading

External links
 Caribbean Financial Action Task Force official website.

Financial crime prevention
Financial regulation
Task forces
Anti-money laundering organizations